Pultenaea alea is a species of flowering plant in the family Fabaceae and is endemic to New South Wales. It is an erect shrub with linear leaves and pea-like flowers arranged near the ends of branchlets.

Description
Pultenaea alea is an erect shrub with sparsely hairy stems.

Taxonomy and naming
Pultenaea alea was first formally described in 2002 by Rogier Petrus Johannes de Kok in Australian Systematic Botany from specimens collected near Casino in 2000. The specific epithet (alea) refers to the town, Casino, near where the type specimens were collected.

Distribution and habitat
This pultenaea grows in forest near Grafton in north-eastern New South Wales.

References

alea
Flora of New South Wales
Plants described in 2002